Ade Orogbemi (born 11 May 1978) is a Nigerian-born British wheelchair basketball player. He was selected to play for Team GB in the 2012 Summer Paralympics in London.

Personal life
Orogbemi was born in Lagos in Nigeria on 11 May 1978. He currently lives at Liverpool, Merseyside. Orogbemi grew up in East London after moving from Lagos. He was born with Poliomyelitis (polio). In 2009 he was jailed for six months for claiming £33,000 worth of housing benefit, council tax benefit and income support. He admitted to three accounts of fraud.

Wheelchair basketball
In 1997, Orogbemi was stopped on the streets by the coach of the East London Bullets and joined the wheelchair basketball team. Ever since then, he has competed in wheelchair basketball. After moving to Liverpool, he played for clubs such as Liverpool Greenbank, Tameside Owls and Wolverhampton Rhinos. He has also played with Toledo, a Spanish wheelchair basketball team. Orogbemi has been classed as a 2.5 player.

In 2001, he played in his first championship, the European Championships, held in Amsterdam in the Netherlands. Along with his team, he was fourth place. In 2003, Orogbemi played at the European Championships in Sassari, Italy, winning bronze. Two years later, he was in Paris, France in the 2005 European Championships, and won silver with his team. He played his first World Championships in 2006, in Amsterdam, where the team were fifth. The following year, he participated in his first Paralympics, the 2008 Summer Paralympic Games, held in Beijing. Along with Team GB, he finished in the bronze medal position. In 2010, at the World Wheelchair Basketball Championships in Birmingham, he finished in fifth place. 2011 saw Orogbemi's first victory, at the European Championships in Nazareth, Israel.

References

Living people
1978 births
Paralympic bronze medalists for Great Britain
Wheelchair basketball players at the 2008 Summer Paralympics
British men's wheelchair basketball players
Wheelchair basketball players at the 2012 Summer Paralympics
Paralympic wheelchair basketball players of Great Britain
English people of Nigerian descent
English people of Yoruba descent
Yoruba sportspeople
Nigerian people with disabilities
Nigerian emigrants to the United Kingdom
Medalists at the 2008 Summer Paralympics
Paralympic medalists in wheelchair basketball